Rafał Gliński (born 29 December 1982) is a Polish handball player for NMC Górnik Zabrze.

He participated at the 2016 European Men's Handball Championship.

References

1982 births
Living people
Sportspeople from Wrocław
Polish male handball players
Vive Kielce players
Expatriate handball players
Polish expatriate sportspeople in Germany